Kayhan London is a  Persian-language Iranian online newspaper based in London. The newspaper was founded in June 1984 by Mostafa Mesbahzadeh. It has an anti-Iranian government view and is banned within Iran.

Kayhan London operates a subsidiary called KAYHAN LIFE, which provides English-language content surrounding Iran.

History 
The first issue of Kayhan London was published on 12 June 1983; it would be published in a weekly format until 30 August 2013, when it was announced that the newspaper would cease publication. Following this, an online version of the newspaper was launched in March 2015.

In 2020, Kayhan London, alongside several other newspapers, was the subject of harassment by the Iranian government; according to Radio Free Europe, the purpose of the harassment was to "silence the only independent news sources for many Iranians".

See also 
 Anti-Iranian sentiment

References 

Persian-language newspapers
Censorship in Iran
Banned newspapers